The 62nd Field Artillery Regiment, RCA is a militia unit of the Canadian Army that has its own military band and is located in Shawinigan, Quebec.  It recruits primarily in Shawinigan, Joliette and Victoriaville.

Origin

Its oldest and most notable subunit is the 81st Field Artillery Battery, which was founded in the Eastern Townships in 1912 and relocated in Shawinigan, Mauricie in 1936.

World War II

The battery was called to active duty during World War II. Its members were trained in Ontario and the United Kingdom from 1940 to 1944.  In 1944-45, the 81st Battery contributed to the Allies' effort in the Normandy Landings, which led to the Liberation of France.

Anti-aircraft Unit

In 1946-48, members of the Shawinigan-based C Company of the Régiment de Joliette joined those of the 81st Battery to form the 62nd Regiment.  From that moment until 1961, the newly formed unit served in an anti-aircraft capacity.

Field artillery

Since 1961, the regiment has been a field artillery unit.  Its equipment consists of 105 mm towed howitzers.  Its armoury is currently located at 5315 Boulevard Royal, Shawinigan.

A substantial number of the 62nd Regiment reservists attend Collège Shawinigan.

Every year on Remembrance Day weekend, members of the regiment gather near the Monument des Braves cenotaph and conduct a ceremony to commemorate soldiers who died on the field of honour.  They also parade in the streets of downtown Shawinigan and Grand-Mère.

Contributions since World War II

Even though the 62nd Regiment has not served in active duty since World War II, it provided personnel for a number of operations, including:

 United Nations Peacekeeping Force in Cyprus (UNFICYP);
 the Oka Crisis in Montérégie;
 United Nations Protection Force (UNPROFOR) in Former Yugoslavia;
 the War in Afghanistan.

Well-known members

Well-known members of the regiment are:

 Gabriel Chrétien, brother of Prime Minister Jean Chrétien;
 Jacques Duchesneau, Chief of Police of the Montreal Urban Community from 1994 to 1998 and Honorary Lieutenant Colonel of the regiment since 2005;
 Gérard Dufresne, Mayor of Shawinigan from 1963 to 1966 and Honorary Colonel of the regiment from 1966 to 2005;
 Yves Duhaime, Provincial Cabinet Member from 1976 to 1985;
 Jean-Pierre Frigon, history teacher at Saint-Tite's Paul-Le Jeune High School and recipient of the Governor General's Award;
 Antonio Lamer (1933–2007), Chief Justice of Canada from 1990 to 2000 and Honorary Lieutenant Colonel of the regiment from 1992 to 1998;
 Victoriaville native Yannick Pépin (1973–2009), who reached the rank of Master Bombardier with the 62nd Regiment in the 1990s, before joining the 5 Combat Engineer Regiment (Major Pépin died in the line of duty while commanding a unit in the War in Afghanistan);
 Ben Weider (1923–2008), Co-founder of the International Federation of BodyBuilders (IFBB), Jewish businessman from Montreal and Honorary Colonel of the regiment from 2005 until his death in 2008.

See also

 History of the Canadian Army
 List of armouries in Canada
 List of units of the Canadian Army

Footnotes

Precedence

Field artillery regiments of Canada
Shawinigan
Military units and formations established in 1961